Censor may refer to:

People with the name
Cato the Elder, also known as Cato the Censor (Marcus Porcius Cato, 234–149 BC), a Roman statesman
Yair Censor (born 1943), Israeli mathematician

Organizations
Censor, the police of the Royal College of Physicians
Imperial censorate, a high-level supervisory agency in ancient China, whose duties involved criticizing other officials

Titles
Censor (Christ Church, Oxford), a student of Christ Church, Oxford undertaking disciplinary duties assigned to deans of other colleges
Censor, the title of the head of the former Fitzwilliam House; see List of Masters of Fitzwilliam College, Cambridge
Censor of St Cuthbert's Society, employed by University of Durham to oversee Society members
Censor Librorum, an expert called on to advise the bishop of diocese whether or not to grant an imprimatur
Chief Censor of New Zealand, the head of the government's Office of Film and Literature Classification
Roman censor, a magistrate for maintaining the census, supervising public morality, etc.

Arts, entertainment, and media
Censor (2001 film), a drama film written and directed by Dev Anand
Censor (2021 film), a horror film directed by Prano Bailey-Bond
"Censor" (song), a single released by the band Skinny Puppy for the song "Dogshit" in 1988

See also
Censer, a small metal or stone dish used for burning incense
Censoring (statistics), the situation when the value of an observation is only partially known
Censorship, the control of speech and other forms of human expression
Censure, a formal reprimand
Census
Sensor, a device or organ that detects or senses a signal or its environment